Daniela Jaworska (born 4 January 1946 in Wyborów, Łódzkie) is a retired javelin thrower from Poland, who represented her native country twice at the Summer Olympics: 1968 and 1972. She set her personal best (62.30 metres) in 1973.

Achievements

References
 

1946 births
Living people
Polish female javelin throwers
Athletes (track and field) at the 1968 Summer Olympics
Athletes (track and field) at the 1972 Summer Olympics
Olympic athletes of Poland
People from Łowicz County
European Athletics Championships medalists
Universiade medalists in athletics (track and field)
Sportspeople from Łódź Voivodeship
Universiade gold medalists for Poland
Medalists at the 1970 Summer Universiade
20th-century Polish women